Newcomerstown High School is a public high school in Newcomerstown, Ohio.  It is the only high school in the Newcomerstown Exempted Village Schools district.

History
Although the school district was first established in 1856, the first building dedicated for grades 9-12 was not built until 1924.  The current high school building, located at 659 Beaver St., was constructed in 1965.

Ohio High School Athletic Association State Championships
 Boys Baseball – 1929

Famous alumni
 Woody Hayes, Ohio State University football coach
 Cy Young, American Major League Baseball pitcher

References

External links
 District Website

High schools in Tuscarawas County, Ohio
Public high schools in Ohio